Epermenia brasiliana is a moth in the family Epermeniidae. It was described by Reinhard Gaedike and Vitor Osmar Becker in 1989. It is found in Brazil.

References

Moths described in 1989
Epermeniidae
Moths of South America